Reddan is a surname. Notable people with the surname include:

Eoin Reddan (born 1980), Irish rugby union player
John Reddan (born 1979), Irish hurler and Gaelic footballer

See also
Redman (surname)